In mathematics, Harnack's inequality is an inequality relating the values of a positive harmonic function at two points, introduced by . Harnack's inequality is used to prove Harnack's theorem about the convergence of sequences of harmonic functions. , and  generalized Harnack's inequality to solutions of elliptic or parabolic partial differential equations. Such results can be used to show the interior regularity of weak solutions.

The statement

Harnack's inequality applies to a non-negative function  f  defined on a closed ball in Rn with radius R and centre x0. It states that, if f is continuous on the closed ball and harmonic on its interior, then for every point x with |x − x0| = r < R,

In the plane R2  (n = 2) the inequality can be written:

for every twice differentiable, harmonic and nonnegative function .

Proof of Harnack's inequality in a ball
By Poisson's formula

where ωn − 1 is the area of the unit sphere in Rn and r = |x − x0|.

Since

 
the kernel in the integrand satisfies

Harnack's inequality follows by substituting this inequality in the above integral and using the fact that the average of a harmonic function over a sphere equals its value at the center of the sphere:

Elliptic partial differential equations
For elliptic partial differential equations, Harnack's inequality states that the supremum of a positive solution in some connected open region is bounded by some constant times the infimum, possibly with an added term containing a functional norm of the data:

 

The constant depends on the ellipticity of the equation and the connected open region.

Parabolic partial differential equations

There is a version of Harnack's inequality for linear parabolic PDEs such as heat equation.

 

with smooth and bounded coefficients and a positive definite matrix . Suppose that  is a solution of

  in 

such that

 

Then there exists a constant C > 0 (depending only on K, and the coefficients of ) such that, for each ,

See also

Harnack's theorem
Harmonic function

References

Kassmann, Moritz (2007), "Harnack Inequalities: An Introduction" Boundary Value Problems 2007:081415, doi: 10.1155/2007/81415, MR 2291922

L. C. Evans (1998), Partial differential equations. American Mathematical Society, USA. For elliptic PDEs see Theorem 5, p. 334 and for parabolic PDEs see Theorem 10, p. 370.

Harmonic functions
Inequalities